Asuman Kiyingi is a Ugandan lawyer and politician. He was the State Minister of Works in Uganda's Cabinet. He was appointed to that position on 1 March 2015, replacing John Byabagambi, who was appointed Minister of Works and Transport. Prior to that, from 27 May 2011 until 1 March 2015, he was the State Minister of Foreign Affairs for Regional Affairs. He was appointed to that position on 27 May 2011. He replaced Isaac Musumba, who was dropped from the cabinet. Before that, he served as the State Minister for Lands from 2009 until 2011. He also represents Bugabula County South, Kamuli District, in the Parliament of Uganda. He has served in that position since 23 February 2006.

Background and education
He was born in Kamuli District on 27 December 1963. While attending Makerere University, Uganda's oldest university, founded in 1922, he earned both a Bachelor of Laws and a Master of Laws. He also holds the Diploma in Legal Practice from the Law Development Center in Kampala.

Work experience
Before his appointment to the cabinet in February 2009, Kiyingi worked in several diverse legal settings. He started as a legal assistant in the Kampala-based legal firm of Ntume, Nyanzi & Company Advocates. Later, he moved to another Kampala legal company called Mugenyi & Company Advocates. He was promoted to the rank of advocate while there. From that job, he became a legal officer with the National Social Security Fund. From there, he became the Corporation Secretary at National Medical Stores, which is Uganda's pharmaceutical acquisition body. The last job he worked before joining politics was as legal counsel to the National Planning Authority. He was elected to the Ugandan Parliament in February 2006, upsetting the then incumbent MP, Salaamu Musumba of the Forum for Democratic Change, opposition political party.

Personal details
Asuman Kiyingi is married. He belongs to the National Resistance Movement political party. He is reported to enjoy debating, travel, theater and poetry.

See also
 Cabinet of Uganda
 Government of Uganda
 Parliament of Uganda

References

External links
 Website of the Parliament of Uganda
 Full List of Cabinet Ministers May 2011

1963 births
Living people
People from Kamuli District
People from Eastern Region, Uganda
Members of the Parliament of Uganda
Government ministers of Uganda
Independent politicians in Uganda
Makerere University alumni
20th-century Ugandan lawyers
Ugandan Muslims
21st-century Ugandan politicians
21st-century Ugandan lawyers